EGA Master  is a manufacturer of tools for professional/industrial use founded by Iñaki Garmendia Ajuria in 1990 and based in Vitoria-Gasteiz (Spain). Originally specialized in pipe tools it later diversified into a wider product range, including mechanical tools, non-sparking tools, titanium non-magnetic tools, insulated tools and explosion-proof intrinsically safe instruments.  It patented the Basque Wrench, among other worldwide patents. The company has customers in over 150 countries, and was selected in 2011 as one of the top 100 Spanish brands.

The company sells to customers in the oil and gas, mining, automotive, aerospace, civil engineering and construction,  telecommunications and heavy industry sectors.

References

External links
 Official site

Tool manufacturing companies of Spain
Basque companies
Spanish brands
Vitoria-Gasteiz
1990 establishments in the Basque Country (autonomous community)